Murali Sreeshankar (born 27 March 1999) is an Indian athlete who competes in the long jump event. He holds the national record of 8.36 metres set  in 2022.

Career
In March 2018, Sreeshankar cleared a 7.99 m jump at the Federation Cup in Patiala. He was named in the Indian contingent for the 2018 Commonwealth Games but had to pull out 10 days before the April event after being diagnosed with appendicitis. Following an emergency appendix surgery, he was placed on a liquid diet, which resulted in significant weight loss and an inability to walk properly. Two months later, he participated in the 2018 Asian Junior Athletics Championships in Gifu despite having "less strength, speed and focus" from before the illness and won bronze with a jump of 7.47 metres. At the 2018 Asian Games in Jakarta, he "struggled with run-up issues" and finished sixth in the final with 7.95 metres.

In September 2018, Sreeshankar broke the national record at the National Open Athletics Championships in Bhubaneswar where he achieved a jump of 8.20 metres. It was also the world leading jump of the season among under-20 athletes and made him the first Indian athlete to qualify for the 2019 World Athletics Championships scheduled to be held in September–October in Doha. At the World Championships, Sreeshankar failed to qualify for the finals, achieving a best leap of 7.62m, with the qualification mark set at 8.15.

Sreeshankar qualified for the 2020 Summer Olympics by recording a jump of 8.26m, a new national record, at the Federation Cup in Patiala in March 2021. At the Olympics, he registered a jump of 7.69m in the qualifying round and failed to enter the final.

At the 2022 World Athletics Championships, he qualified for the final round and finished seventh with a jump of 7.96 m. At the 2022 Commonwealth Games, he won the silver medal with a jump of 8.08 metres and became the first male long jumper from India to win a silver medal at the Games.

Personal life
Sreeshankar is coached by his father S. Murali who is a former triple jump athlete and silver medalist at the South Asian Games. Sreeshankar would accompany his father at practices as a four-year-old, when his father noticed his potential as a sprinter. Sreeshankar became a state-level under-10 champion in 50 metres and 100 metres, but switched from sprinting to long jump at the age of 13. His mother K. S. Bijimol had won silver medal in 800 metres at the 1992 Asian Junior Athletics Championships. His sister Sreeparvathy is a heptathlete. As of August 2019, Sreeshankar is pursuing BSc in mathematics at the Government Victoria College, Palakkad.

Sreeshankar is part of the Target Olympic Podium (TOP) scheme started by the Ministry of Youth Affairs and Sports. He is sponsored by JSW Sports and supported by JSW's Inspire Institute of Sport in Bellary district, Karnataka.

References

External links
 

1999 births
Living people
Indian male long jumpers
Athletes from Palakkad
Athletes (track and field) at the 2018 Asian Games
Asian Games competitors for India
Athletes (track and field) at the 2020 Summer Olympics
Olympic athletes of India
Athletes (track and field) at the 2022 Commonwealth Games
Commonwealth Games silver medallists for India
Commonwealth Games medallists in athletics
21st-century Indian people
Medallists at the 2022 Commonwealth Games